The 1990 Auckland City mayoral by-election was held to fill the vacant position of Mayor of Auckland. The polling was conducted using the standard first-past-the-post electoral method.

Background
The by-election was triggered by the resignation of sitting Mayor Catherine Tizard after she was appointed to the position of Governor-General. Twenty candidates came forward for the contest, with businessman and former athlete Les Mills the winner. It was the first Mayoral by-election in Auckland since the death of Thomas Ashby in 1957.

Results
The following table gives the election results:

Outcome
After Mills won the election it was revealed that he spent $50,000 on his campaign. At the time spending limits were not imposed on local government elections, however unprecedented levels of spending the 1989 and 1990 elections prompted Minister of Local Government Warren Cooper to launch an inquiry on the matter.

Notes

References

Mayoral elections in Auckland
1990 elections in New Zealand
Politics of the Auckland Region
1990s in Auckland
December 1990 events in New Zealand